Rentz is a city in Laurens County, Georgia, United States. The population was 295 at the 2010 census. It is part of the Dublin Micropolitan Statistical Area.

History
The Georgia General Assembly incorporated Rentz as a town in 1905. The community was named after E. P. Rentz, a businessperson in the local lumber industry. A post office has been in operation at Rentz since 1905.

Geography

Rentz is located in southwestern Laurens County at  (32.384064, -82.991633). Georgia State Route 117 (Proctor Street) runs through the center of town; it leads northeast  to U.S. Route 441 and southwest the same distance to Cadwell.

Demographics

As of the census of 2000, there were 304 people, 142 households, and 94 families residing in the town. The racial makeup of the town was 94.08% White, 3.29% African American, 0.99% Native American, 0.66% Asian, and 0.99% from two or more races. Hispanic or Latino of any race were 0.99% of the population.

There were 142 households, out of which 25.4% had children under the age of 18 living with them, 52.8% were married couples living together, 7.7% had a female householder with no husband present, and 33.8% were non-families. 32.4% of all households were made up of individuals, and 19.7% had someone living alone who was 65 years of age or older.  The average household size was 2.14 and the average family size was 2.65.

In the town, the population was spread out, with 19.1% under the age of 18, 6.9% from 18 to 24, 24.3% from 25 to 44, 24.0% from 45 to 64, and 25.7% who were 65 years of age or older.  The median age was 45 years. For every 100 females, there were 91.2 males.  For every 100 females age 18 and over, there were 87.8 males.

The median income for a household in the town was $25,000, and the median income for a family was $41,250. Males had a median income of $26,042 versus $25,625 for females. The per capita income for the town was $16,427.  About 13.0% of families and 18.5% of the population were below the poverty line, including 24.3% of those under the age of eighteen and 22.7% of those 65 or over.

Education
Though Rentz once had a grade 1-12 school, it closed many years ago.  Laurens County Schools opened Southwest Laurens Elementary just outside town in the fall of 2000.

References

Cities in Laurens County, Georgia
Cities in Georgia (U.S. state)
Dublin, Georgia micropolitan area